From 13–18 May 1948 Jewish forces from the Haganah and Irgun executed Operation Kilshon ("Pitchfork"). Its aim was to capture the Jewish suburbs of Jerusalem, particularly Talbiya in central Jerusalem.

Operation
At midnight on Friday 14 May, the British declared its civil and military authority in Jerusalem to be at an end. In the morning they evacuated the city in two large convoys, one moved north towards Haifa and the other south towards Bethlehem. The Zionists managed to obtain a schedule of their withdrawal in advance and could thereafter launch the operation almost immediately.

The Yishuv forces quickly managed to take control of buildings that the British had nationalized in "Bevingrad" zones. These were heavily fortified security zones that the British had built up around key installations in the city to protect against Irgun attacks. From 1946 to 1948, security zones with huge coils of barbed wire filling the streets and dragon's teeth blocking the incursion of armed vehicles began appearing around Jerusalem. One such zone, established in 1946, encompassed the eastern end of Jaffa Road and included the Russian Compound, the Anglo-Palestine Bank, the Central Post Office, and the Generali Building. Jerusalemites called these fortified zones "Bevingrad", a portmanteau of the name of the British Foreign Secretary Ernest Bevin, who had denied Holocaust survivors entry to Palestine, and the Russian city of Stalingrad, where large-scale fortifications had been emplaced prior to the 1942 Battle of Stalingrad.

On Friday, 14 May 1948, the Irgun forces headed for the Bevingrad on Jaffa Road. The first building they recaptured was the Generali Building, now evacuated. The Irgun forces hoisted the Israeli flag over the lion statue on the roof before moving on to take control of the Russian Compound and the Police Academy further north.

They also recaptured the Notre Dame Church, the American Colony, Sheikh Jarrah, Talbiya, German Colony, Baka, Talpiot, and the Greek Colony.

A large portion of what was captured was to become the Israeli-controlled portion of Jerusalem—"West Jerusalem"—but some of the heaviest battles of the 1948 Arab-Israeli war were to follow and the Jerusalem frontier was to be redrawn many times.

See also
 1947–48 Civil War in Mandatory Palestine
 List of battles and operations in the 1948 Palestine war
 Depopulated Palestinian locations in Israel

References

External links
 Etzel (Irgun) history

Photos
 Bevingrad surrounded by barbed wire on the left

Nachshon
20th century in Jerusalem
May 1948 events in Asia
1940s in Jerusalem